Democratic Party of Unity (Demokratska stranka jedinstva, DSJ) is a minor extra-parliamentary national conservative Serbian-Montenegrin unionist political party in Montenegro.

History
Party was founded in July 2006 by Zoran Žižić, former Prime Minister of the Federal Republic of Yugoslavia and former Deputy Prime Minister of Montenegro. Between 2006 and 2009, the party was a constituent member of the Serb List (Srpska lista) coalition. 

During the 2012 and from 2015 until 2017, the DSJ was a constituent member of the opposition right-wing Democratic Front (DF) alliance. Party supported For the Future of Montenegro (ZBCG) list for the 2020 parliamentary election.

Electoral results

Parliamentary elections

References

Serb political parties in Montenegro
National conservative parties
Right-wing parties in Europe